Sparganothina aureola is a species of moth of the family Tortricidae. It is found in Costa Rica.

The length of the forewings is about 7.2 mm. The forewings are bright yellowish orange with dark brown markings. The hindwings are pale golden yellow.

Etymology
The species name refers to the colour of the species and is derived from Latin aureolis (meaning golden, splendid).

References

Moths described in 2001
Sparganothini